Raiffeisen banka a.d. Beograd is the Serbian subsidiary of Austria-based Raiffeisen Bankgruppe. As of 2009, bank maintains a total of 102 branches throughout Serbia.

History

Though it obtained the operating licence in March 2001, and fully operated since July 2001, the bank officially opened on 12 October 2001 during the Austrian chancellor Wolfgang Schüssel's state visit to Belgrade. Its original name was Raiffeisenbank Jugoslavija a.d.

With a founding capital of €10 million (99% of it belonging to RZB and 1% to Austrian Uniqa Beteiligungs Holding GmbH - insurance company), it became the first 100% foreign-owned bank in then-Federal Republic of Yugoslavia. Starting from Belgrade, the bank gradually expanded its network all over Serbia. During 2004, the name was changed to Raiffeisen banka a.d.

On 5 August 2021, Raiffeisen Bank signed an agreement to acquire 100% of the shares of Crédit Agricole Srbija.

See also
 List of banks in Serbia

References

External links
  
 Rajfajzen najbolja banka u Srbiji, B92, March 22, 2008

Banks established in 2001
Banks of Serbia
Companies based in Belgrade
Raiffeisen Zentralbank
Serbian companies established in 2001